Bossemans et Coppenolle is a Belgian play by Joris d’Hanswyck and Paul Van Stalle. It was first staged in 1938.

Concept
The story is a comedy about two dimwitted men from Brussels, Bossemans and Coppenolle. Much of the comedy comes from the fact that the characters all speak in the local Brussels dialect, which added to its popularity in Brussels and Wallonia. The plot broadly parodies Romeo & Juliet, with the contending families on opposite side of the contemporary Brussels football rivalry between Daring Club de Bruxelles and Union Saint-Gilloise.

Characters
 Bossemans: interior decoration merchant.
 Coppenolle: his friend, 
 Mme Coppenolle: his wife
 Madame Chapeau: An older lady, whose part is usually played by male actors.
 Violette : Rents apartment of Coppenolle
 Josef Bossemans: son of Bossemans, loves
 Georgette Coppenolle: fille de Coppenolle.

Legacy

The play became popular enough to run for several decades. In 1938 Gaston Schoukens even adapted it into film, starring Gustave Libeau, Marcel Roels, Billy Pitt and Léon Carny. The film also depicts an actual association football match between Belgian soccer clubs Royale Union Saint-Gilloise and Daring Club de Bruxelles.

Belgian plays
1938 plays
Comedy plays
Literary duos
Fictional Belgian people
Plays set in Belgium
Brussels in fiction
Belgian plays adapted into films